Olympiacos B.C. in international competitions is the history and statistics of Olympiacos B.C. in FIBA Europe and Euroleague Basketball Company competitions.

1960s

1960–61 FIBA European Champions Cup, 1st–tier
The 1960–61 FIBA European Champions Cup was the 4th installment of the European top-tier level professional basketball club competition FIBA European Champions Cup (now called EuroLeague), running from November 29, 1960 to July 26, 1961. The trophy was won by CSKA Moscow, who defeated the title holder Rīgas ASK by a result of 141–128 in a two-legged final on a home and away basis. Overall, Olympiacos achieved in the present competition a record of 0 wins against 2 defeats, in only one round. More detailed:

First round
 Tie played on November 23*, 1960 and on December 11, 1960.

|}
*The game conducted six days before the official opening of the competition.

1970s

1972–73 FIBA European Cup Winners' Cup, 2nd–tier
The 1972–73 FIBA European Cup Winners' Cup was the 7th installment of FIBA's 2nd-tier level European-wide professional club basketball competition FIBA European Cup Winners' Cup (lately called FIBA Saporta Cup), running from October 18, 1972 to March 20, 1973. The trophy was won by Spartak Leningrad, who defeated Jugoplastika by a result of 77–62 at Alexandreio Melathron in Thessaloniki, Greece. Overall, Olympiacos achieved in the present competition a record of 1 win against 3 defeats, in three successive rounds. More detailed:

First round
 Bye

Second round
 Tie played on November 8, 1972 and on November 15, 1972.

|}
*The score in the second leg at the end of regulation was 89–69 for Olympiacos, so it was necessary to play an extra-time to decide the winner of this match.

Top 12
 Tie played on December 6, 1972 and on December 13, 1972.

|}

1973–74 FIBA European Cup Winners' Cup, 2nd–tier
The 1973–74 FIBA European Cup Winners' Cup was the 8th installment of FIBA's 2nd-tier level European-wide professional club basketball competition FIBA European Cup Winners' Cup (lately called FIBA Saporta Cup), running from October 17, 1973 to April 2, 1974. The trophy was won by Crvena zvezda, who defeated Spartak ZJŠ Brno by a result of 86–75 at Palasport Primo Carnera in Udine, Italy. Overall, Olympiacos achieved in the present competition a record of 2 wins against 1 defeat, plus 1 draw, in three successive rounds. More detailed:

First round
 Bye

Second round
 Tie played on November 7, 1973 and on November 14, 1973.

|}

Top 12
 Tie played on November 28, 1973 and on December 5, 1973.

|}

1975–76 FIBA European Cup Winners' Cup, 2nd–tier
The 1973–74 FIBA European Cup Winners' Cup was the 10th installment of FIBA's 2nd-tier level European-wide professional club basketball competition FIBA European Cup Winners' Cup (lately called FIBA Saporta Cup), running from October 29, 1975 to March 17, 1976. The trophy was won by Cinzano Milano, who defeated ASPO Tours by a result of 88–83 at Palasport Parco Ruffini in Turin, Italy. Overall, Olympiacos achieved in the present competition a record of 5 wins against 5 defeats, in three successive rounds. More detailed:

First round
 Tie played on October 20, 1975 and on November 5, 1975.

|}

Top 14
 Tie played on November 19, 1975 and on November 26, 1975.

|}

Quarterfinals
 Day 1 (January 7, 1976) / Day 2 (January 14, 1976)

|}

 Day 3 (January 21, 1976) / Day 4 (January 28, 1976)

|}

 Day 5 (February 4, 1976) / Day 6 (February 11, 1976)

|}

 Group A standings:

1976–77 FIBA European Champions Cup, 1st–tier
The 1976–77 FIBA European Champions Cup was the 20th installment of the European top-tier level professional basketball club competition FIBA European Champions Cup (now called EuroLeague), running from October 14, 1976 to April 7, 1977. The trophy was won by Maccabi Tel Aviv, who defeated the title holder Mobilgirgi Varese by a result of 78–77, at Hala Pionir, in Belgrade, SFR Yugoslavia. Overall, Olympiacos achieved in the present competition a record of 2 wins against 4 defeats, in only one round. More detailed:

First round
 Day 1 (October 14, 1976)

|}

 Day 2 (October 21, 1976)

|}

 Day 3 (October 28, 1976)

|}

 Day 4 (November 4, 1976)

|}

 Day 5 (November 18, 1976)

|}

 Day 6 (November 25, 1976)

|}

 Group E standings:

1977–78 FIBA European Cup Winners' Cup, 2nd–tier
The 1977–78 FIBA European Cup Winners' Cup was the 12th installment of FIBA's 2nd-tier level European-wide professional club basketball competition FIBA European Cup Winners' Cup (lately called FIBA Saporta Cup), running from October 19, 1977 to March 29, 1978. The trophy was won by the title holder Gabetti Cantù, who defeated Sinudyne Bologna by a result of 84–82 at PalaLido in Milan, Italy. Overall, Olympiacos achieved in the present competition a record of 2 wins against 2 defeats, in two successive rounds. More detailed:

First round
 Tie played on October 19, 1977 and on October 26, 1977.

|}

Top 15
 Tie played on November 16, 1977 and on November 23, 1977.

|}

1978–79 FIBA European Champions Cup, 1st–tier
The 1978–79 FIBA European Champions Cup was the 22nd installment of the European top-tier level professional basketball club competition FIBA European Champions Cup (now called EuroLeague), running from November 2, 1978 to April 5, 1979. The trophy was won by Bosna, who defeated Emerson Varese by a result of 96–93 at Palais des Sports in Grenoble, France. Overall, Olympiacos achieved in the present competition a record of 5 wins against 11 defeats, in two successive rounds. More detailed:

First round
 Day 1 (November 2, 1978)

|}

 Day 2 (November 9, 1978)

|}

 Day 3 (November 16, 1978)

|}

 Day 4 (November 23, 1978)

|}

 Day 5 (November 30, 1978)

|}

 Day 6 (December 7, 1978)

|}

 Group D standings:

Semifinals
 Day 1 (January 10, 1979)

|}

 Day 2 (January 17, 1979)

|}

 Day 3 (January 25, 1979)

|}

 Day 4 (February 1, 1979)

|}

 Day 5 (February 7, 1979)

|}

 Day 6 (February 15, 1979)

|}

 Day 7 (February 28, 1979)

|}

 Day 8 (March 7, 1979)

|}

 Day 9 (March 15, 1979)

|}

 Day 10 (March 21, 1979)

|}

 Semifinals group stage standings:

1980s

1979–80 FIBA Korać Cup, 3rd–tier
The 1979–80 FIBA Korać Cup was the 9th installment of the European 3rd-tier level professional basketball club competition FIBA Korać Cup, running from October 31, 1979 to March 26, 1980. The trophy was won by Arrigoni Rieti, who defeated Cibona by a result of 76–71 at Country Hall du Sart Tilman in Liège, Belgium. Overall, Olympiacos achieved in the present competition a record of 3 wins against 3 defeats, in three successive rounds. More detailed:

First round
 Bye

Second round
 Bye

Top 16
 Day 1 (January 9, 1980)

|}

 Day 2 (January 16, 1980)

|}

 Day 3 (January 23, 1980)

|}

 Day 4 (February 6, 1980)

|}
*Overtime at the end of regulation (77–77).

 Day 5 (February 13, 1980)

|}

 Day 6 (February 20, 1980)

|}

 Group B standings:

1980–81 FIBA European Cup Winners' Cup, 2nd–tier
The 1980–81 FIBA European Cup Winners' Cup was the 15th installment of FIBA's 2nd-tier level European-wide professional club basketball competition FIBA European Cup Winners' Cup (lately called FIBA Saporta Cup), running from October 7, 1980 to March 18, 1981. The trophy was won by Squibb Cantù, who defeated FC Barcelona by a result of 86–82 at PalaEUR in Rome, Italy. Overall, Olympiacos achieved in the present competition a record of 0 wins against 2 defeats, in only one round. More detailed:

First round
 Tie played on October 7, 1980 and on October 14, 1980.

|}

1981–82 FIBA Korać Cup, 3rd–tier
The 1981–82 FIBA Korać Cup was the 11th installment of the European 3rd-tier level professional basketball club competition FIBA Korać Cup, running from October 7, 1981 to March 18, 1982. The trophy was won by Limoges CSP, who defeated Šibenka by a result of 90–84 at Palasport San Lazzaro in Padua, Italy. Overall, Olympiacos achieved in present competition a record of 1 win against 1 defeat, in one round. More detailed:

First round
 Tie played on October 7, 1981 and on October 14, 1981.

|}

1982–83 FIBA Korać Cup, 3rd–tier
The 1982–83 FIBA Korać Cup was the 12th installment of the European 3rd-tier level professional basketball club competition FIBA Korać Cup, running from October 6, 1982 to March 8, 1983. The trophy was won by the title holder Limoges CSP, who defeated -for second consecutive time- Šibenka by a result of 94–86 at Deutschlandhalle in West Berlin, West Germany. Overall, Olympiacos achieved in present competition a record of 1 win against 1 defeat, in one round. More detailed:

First round
 Tie played on October 6, 1982 and on October 13, 1982.

|}

1983–84 FIBA Korać Cup, 3rd–tier
The 1983–84 FIBA Korać Cup was the 13th installment of the European 3rd-tier level professional basketball club competition FIBA Korać Cup, running from September 28, 1983 to March 15, 1984. The trophy was won by Orthez, who defeated Crvena zvezda by a result of 97–73 at Palais des sports Pierre de Coubertin in Paris, France. Overall, Olympiacos achieved in present competition a record of 0 wins against 2 defeats, in two successive rounds. More detailed:

First round
 Bye

Second round
 Tie played on October 26, 1983 and on November 2, 1983.

|}
*Olympiacos withdrew before the first leg and his rival received a forfeit (2-0) in both games.

1986–87 FIBA Korać Cup, 3rd–tier
The 1986–87 FIBA Korać Cup was the 16th installment of the European 3rd-tier level professional basketball club competition FIBA Korać Cup, running from October 1, 1986 to March 25, 1987. The trophy was won by FC Barcelona, who defeated Limoges CSP by a result of 203–171 in a two-legged final on a home and away basis. Overall, Olympiacos achieved in present competition a record of 0 wins against 2 defeat, in two successive rounds. More detailed:

First round
 Bye

Second round
 Tie played on October 29, 1986 and on November 5, 1986.

|}

1988–89 FIBA Korać Cup, 3rd–tier
The 1988–89 FIBA Korać Cup was the 18th installment of the European 3rd-tier level professional basketball club competition FIBA Korać Cup, running from October 12, 1988 to March 22, 1989. The trophy was won by Partizan, who defeated Wiwa Vismara Cantù by a result of 177–171 in a two-legged final on a home and away basis. Overall, Olympiacos achieved in present competition a record of 4 wins against 6 defeats, in three successive rounds. More detailed:

First round
 Tie played on October 12, 1988 and on October 19, 1988.

|}

Second round
 Tie played on November 2, 1988 and November 9, 1988.

|}
*The score in the second leg at the end of the regulation was 83–104 for Dinamo Tbilisi, so it was necessary to play an extra-time to decide the winner of this match.

Top 16
 Day 1 (December 7, 1988)

|}

 Day 2 (December 14, 1988)

|}

 Day 3 (January 11, 1989)

|}

 Day 4 (January 18, 1989)

|}

 Day 5 (January 25, 1989)

|}

 Day 6 (February 1, 1989)

|}

 Group B standings:

1990s

1992–93 FIBA European League, 1st–tier
The 1992–93 FIBA European League was the 36th installment of the European top-tier level professional club competition for basketball clubs (now called EuroLeague), running from September 10, 1992 to April 15, 1993. The trophy was won by Limoges CSP, who defeated Benetton Treviso by a result of 59–55 at Peace and Friendship Stadium in Piraeus, Greece. Overall, Olympiacos achieved in present competition a record of 11 wins against 8 defeats, in four successive rounds. More detailed:

First round
 Bye

Second round
 Tie played on October 1, 1992 and on October 8, 1992.

|}

Top 16
 Day 1 (October 29, 1992)

|}

 Day 2 (November 5, 1992)

|}
*Overtime at the end of regulation (54–54).

 Day 3 (November 25, 1992)

|}

 Day 4 (December 3, 1992)

|}
*Overtime at the end of regulation (83–83).

 Day 5 (December 9, 1992)

|}

 Day 6 (December 17, 1992)

|}

 Day 7 (January 7, 1993)

|}

 Day 8 (January 13, 1993)

|}

 Day 9 (January 21, 1993)

|}

 Day 10 (January 28, 1993)

|}

 Day 11 (February 3, 1993)

|}

 Day 12 (February 11, 1993)

|}

 Day 13 (February 18, 1993)

|}

 Day 14 (February 24, 1993)

|}

 Group B standings:

Quarterfinals
 Best-of-3 playoff: Game 1 at home on March 11, 1993 / Game 2 away on March 15, 1993 / Game 3 away on March 17, 1993.

|}

1993–94 FIBA European League, 1st–tier
The 1993–94 FIBA European League was the 37th installment of the European top-tier level professional club competition for basketball clubs (now called EuroLeague), running from September 9, 1993 to April 21, 1994. The trophy was won by 7up Joventut, who defeated Olympiacos by a result of 59–57 at Yad Eliyahu Arena in Tel Aviv, Israel. Overall, Olympiacos achieved in present competition a record of 14 wins against 5 defeats, in six successive rounds. More detailed:

First round
 Bye

Second round
 Bye

Top 16
 Day 1 (October 28, 1993)

|}

 Day 2 (November 4, 1993)

|}

 Day 3 (November 24, 1993)

|}

 Day 4 (December 2, 1993)

|}

 Day 5 (December 9, 1993)

|}

 Day 6 (December 15, 1993)

|}

 Day 7 (January 6, 1994)

|}

 Day 8 (January 13, 1994)

|}

 Day 9 (January 19, 1994)

|}

 Day 10 (January 26, 1994)

|}
*Overtime at the end of regulation (66–66).

 Day 11 (February 2, 1994)

|}

 Day 12 (February 10, 1994)

|}

 Day 13 (February 16, 1994)

|}

 Day 14 (February 23, 1994)

|}

 Group A standings:

Quarterfinals
 Best-of-3 playoff: Game 1 away on March 10, 1994 / Game 2 at home on March 15, 1994 / Game 3 at home on March 17, 1994.

|}

Final four
The 1994 FIBA European League Final Four, was the 1993–94 season's FIBA European League Final Four tournament, organized by FIBA Europe.

 Semifinals: April 19, 1994 at Yad Eliyahu Arena in Tel Aviv, Israel.

|}

 Final: April 21, 1994 at Yad Eliyahu Arena in Tel Aviv, Israel.

|}

 Final four standings:

1994–95 FIBA European League, 1st–tier
The 1994–95 FIBA European League was the 38th installment of the European top-tier level professional club competition for basketball clubs (now called EuroLeague), running from September 8, 1994 to April 13, 1995. The trophy was won by Real Madrid Teka, who defeated Olympiacos by a result of 73–61 at Pabellón Príncipe Felipe in Zaragoza, Spain. Overall, Olympiacos achieved in present competition a record of 12 wins against 7 defeats, in six successive rounds. More detailed:

First round
 Bye

Second round
 Bye

Top 16
 Day 1 (October 27, 1994)

|}

 Day 2 (November 2, 1994)

|}

 Day 3 (November 24, 1994)

|}
*Overtime at the end of regulation (65–65).

 Day 4 (December 1, 1994)

|}

 Day 5 (December 8, 1994)

|}

 Day 6 (December 15, 1994)

|}

 Day 7 (January 4, 1995)

|}

 Day 8 (January 12, 1995)

|}

 Day 9 (January 19, 1995)

|}

 Day 10 (January 26, 1995)

|}

 Day 11 (February 2, 1995)

|}

 Day 12 (February 9, 1995)

|}

 Day 13 (February 16, 1995)

|}

 Day 14 (February 23, 1995)

|}

 Group B standings:

Quarterfinals
 Best-of-3 playoff: Game 1 away on March 9, 1995 / Game 2 at home on March 14, 1995 / Game 3 at home on March 16, 1995.

|}

Final four
The 1995 FIBA European League Final Four, was the 1994–95 season's FIBA European League Final Four tournament, organized by FIBA Europe.

 Semifinals: April 11, 1995 at Pabellón Príncipe Felipe in Zaragoza, Spain.

|}

 Final: April 13, 1995 at Pabellón Príncipe Felipe in Zaragoza, Spain.

|}

 Final four standings:

1995–96 FIBA European League, 1st–tier
The 1995–96 FIBA European League was the 39th installment of the European top-tier level professional club competition for basketball clubs (now called EuroLeague), running from September 7, 1995 to April 11, 1996. The trophy was won by Panathinaikos, who defeated FC Barcelona Banca Catalana by a result of 67–66 at Palais Omnisports de Paris-Bercy in Paris, France. Overall, Olympiacos achieved in present competition a record of 11 wins against 6 defeats, in four successive rounds. More detailed:

First round
 Bye

Second round
 Bye

Top 16
 Day 1 (October 26, 1995)

|}

 Day 2 (November 2, 1995)

|}

 Day 3 (November 23, 1995)

|}

 Day 4 (November 29, 1995)

|}

 Day 5 (December 7, 1995)

|}

 Day 6 (December 13, 1995)

|}

 Day 7 (December 21, 1995)

|}
*Overtime at the end of regulation (62–62).

 Day 8 (January 4, 1996)

|}

 Day 9 (January 11, 1996)

|}

 Day 10 (January 18, 1996)

|}

 Day 11 (January 24, 1996)

|}
*Overtime at the end of regulation (67–67).

 Day 12 (February 1, 1996)

|}

 Day 13 (February 7, 1996)

|}

 Day 14 (February 14, 1996)

|}

 Group A standings:

Quarterfinals
 Best-of-3 playoff: Game 1 at home on March 7, 1996 / Game 2 away on March 12, 1996 / Game 3 away on March 14, 1996.

|}

1996–97 FIBA EuroLeague, 1st–tier
The 1996–97 FIBA EuroLeague was the 40th installment of the European top-tier level professional club competition for basketball clubs (now called simply EuroLeague), running from September 19, 1996 to April 24, 1997. The trophy was won by Olympiacos, who defeated FC Barcelona Banca Catalana by a result of 73–58 at PalaEUR in Rome, Italy. Overall, Olympiacos achieved in present competition a record of 15 wins against 8 defeats, in six successive rounds. More detailed:

First round
 Day 1 (September 19, 1996)

|}

 Day 2 (September 26, 1996)

|}

 Day 3 (October 3, 1996)

|}
*Overtime at the end of regulation (68–68).

 Day 4 (October 10, 1996)

|}

 Day 5 (October 17, 1996)

|}

 Day 6 (November 6, 1996)

|}

 Day 7 (November 13, 1996)

|}
*Overtime at the end of regulation (66–66).

 Day 8 (November 21, 1996)

|}

 Day 9 (December 5, 1996)

|}

 Day 10 (December 12, 1996)

|}

 Group B standings:

Second round
 Day 1 (January 9, 1997)

|}

 Day 2 (January 16, 1997)

|}

 Day 3 (January 23, 1997)

|}

 Day 4 (February 6, 1997)

|}

 Day 5 (February 13, 1997)

|}

 Day 6 (February 20, 1997)

|}

 Group E standings:

Top 16
 Best-of-3 playoff: Game 1 away on March 6, 1997 / Game 2 at home on March 11, 1997 / Game 3 away on March 13, 1997.

|}

Quarterfinals
 Best-of-3 playoff: Game 1 away on March 27, 1997 / Game 2 at home on April 1, 1997.

|}

Final four
The 1997 FIBA EuroLeague Final Four, was the 1996–97 season's FIBA EuroLeague Final Four tournament, organized by FIBA Europe.

 Semifinals: April 22, 1997 at PalaEUR in Rome, Italy.

|}

 Final: April 24, 1997 at PalaEUR in Rome, Italy.

|}

 Final four standings:

1997–98 FIBA EuroLeague, 1st–tier
The 1997–98 FIBA EuroLeague was the 41st installment of the European top-tier level professional club competition for basketball clubs (now called simply EuroLeague), running from September 18, 1997 to April 23, 1998. The trophy was won by Kinder Bologna, who defeated AEK by a result of 58–44 at Palau Sant Jordi in Barcelona, Spain. Overall, Olympiacos achieved in present competition a record of 12 wins against 6 defeats, in three successive rounds. More detailed:

First round
 Day 1 (September 18, 1997)

|}

 Day 2 (September 25, 1997)

|}

 Day 3 (October 2, 1997)

|}

 Day 4 (October 9, 1997)

|}

 Day 5 (October 23, 1997)

|}

 Day 6 (November 6, 1997)

|}

 Day 7 (November 12, 1997)

|}

 Day 8 (November 20, 1997)

|}

 Day 9 (December 11, 1997)

|}

 Day 10 (December 18, 1997)

|}

 Group A standings:

Second round
 Day 1 (January 7, 1998)

|}

 Day 2 (January 15, 1998)

|}

 Day 3 (January 22, 1998)

|}

 Day 4 (February 4, 1998)

|}

 Day 5 (February 12, 1998)

|}

 Day 6 (February 19, 1998)

|}

 Group E standings:

Top 16
 Best-of-3 playoff: Game 1 at home on March 3, 1998 / Game 2 away on March 5, 1998.

|}

1998–99 FIBA EuroLeague, 1st–tier
The 1998–99 FIBA EuroLeague was the 42nd installment of the European top-tier level professional club competition for basketball clubs (now called simply EuroLeague), running from September 24, 1998 to April 22, 1999. The trophy was won by Žalgiris, who defeated the title holder Kinder Bologna by a result of 82–74 at Olympiahalle in Munich, Germany. Overall, Olympiacos achieved in present competition a record of 16 wins against 6 defeats, in six successive rounds. More detailed:

First round
 Day 1 (September 24, 1998)

|}

 Day 2 (October 1, 1998)

|}

 Day 3 (October 8, 1998)

|}

 Day 4 (October 15, 1998)

|}

 Day 5 (October 22, 1998)

|}

 Day 6 (November 5, 1998)

|}

 Day 7 (November 12, 1998)

|}

 Day 8 (November 19, 1998)

|}

 Day 9 (December 10, 1998)

|}

 Day 10 (December 18, 1998)

|}

 Group C standings:

Second round
 Day 1 (January 7, 1999)

|}

 Day 2 (January 13, 1999)

|}

 Day 3 (January 21, 1999)

|}

 Day 4 (February 4, 1999)

|}

 Day 5 (February 10, 1999)

|}

 Day 6 (February 17, 1999)

|}

 Group G standings:

Top 16
 Best-of-3 playoff: Game 1 at home on March 2, 1999 / Game 2 away on March 4, 1999.

|}
*Two Overtimes at the end of regulation (57–57 and 67–67).

Quarterfinals
 Best-of-3 playoff: Game 1 at home on March 23, 1999 / Game 2 away on March 25, 1999.

|}

Final four
The 1999 FIBA EuroLeague Final Four, was the 1998–99 season's FIBA EuroLeague Final Four tournament, organized by FIBA Europe.

 Semifinals: April 20, 1999 at Olympiahalle in Munich, Germany.

|}

 3rd place game: April 22, 1999 at Olympiahalle in Munich, Germany.

|}

 Final four standings:

2000s

1999–2000 FIBA EuroLeague, 1st–tier
The 1999–2000 FIBA EuroLeague was the 43rd installment of the European top-tier level professional club competition for basketball clubs (now called simply EuroLeague), running from September 23, 1999 to April 20, 2000. The trophy was won by Panathinaikos, who defeated Maccabi Tel Aviv by a result of 73–67 at PAOK Sports Arena in Thessaloniki, Greece. Overall, Olympiacos achieved in present competition a record of 11 wins against 8 defeats, in three successive rounds. More detailed:

First round
 Day 1 (September 23, 1999)

|}

 Day 2 (September 30, 1999)

|}

 Day 3 (October 7, 1999)

|}

 Day 4 (October 20, 1999)

|}

 Day 5 (October 27, 1999)

|}

 Day 6 (November 4, 1999)

|}

 Day 7 (November 10, 1999)

|}

 Day 8 (November 18, 1999)

|}

 Day 9 (December 8, 1999)

|}

 Day 10 (December 18, 1999)

|}

 Group C standings:

Second round
 Day 1 (January 6, 2000)

|}

 Day 2 (January 12, 2000)

|}

 Day 3 (January 19, 2000)

|}

 Day 4 (February 3, 2000)

|}

 Day 5 (February 9, 2000)

|}

 Day 6 (February 16, 2000)

|}

 Group G standings:

Top 16
 Best-of-3 playoff: Game 1 away on February 29, 2000 / Game 2 at home on March 2, 2000 / Game 3 away on March 9, 2000.

|}

2000–01 Euroleague, 1st–tier
The 2000–01 Euroleague was the inaugural season of the EuroLeague, under the newly formed Euroleague Basketball Company's authority, and it was the 44th installment of the European top-tier level professional club competition for basketball clubs, running from October 19, 2000 to May 10, 2001. The trophy was won by Kinder Bologna, who defeated Tau Cerámica in a Best-of-5 playoff final series by a result of 3–2. Overall, Olympiacos achieved in present competition a record of 9 wins against 5 defeats, in three successive rounds. More detailed:

Regular season
 Day 1 (October 16, 2000)*

|}
*Opening Euroleague game, played on 16-10-2001.

 Day 2 (October 26, 2000)

|}

 Day 3 (November 2, 2000)

|}

 Day 4 (November 9, 2000)

|}

 Day 5 (November 16, 2000)

|}

 Day 6 (December 6, 2000)

|}

 Day 7 (December 14, 2000)

|}

 Day 8 (December 21, 2000)

|}

 Day 9 (January 11, 2001)

|}

 Day 10 (January 18, 2001)

|}

 Group C standings:

Top 16
 Best-of-3 playoff: Game 1 at home on January 31, 2001 / Game 2 away on February 7, 2001 / Game 3 at home on February 15, 2001.

|}

Quarterfinals
 Best-of-3 playoff: Game 1 at home on February 22, 2001 / Game 2 away on February 28, 2001.

|}

2001–02 Euroleague, 1st–tier
The 2001–02 Euroleague was the 2nd season of the EuroLeague, under the newly formed Euroleague Basketball Company's authority, and it was the 45th installment of the European top-tier level professional club competition for basketball clubs, running from October 10, 2001 to May 5, 2002. The trophy was won by Panathinaikos, who defeated the title holder Kinder Bologna by a result of 89–83 at PalaMalaguti in Bologna, Italy. Overall, Olympiacos achieved in present competition a record of 14 wins against 6 defeats, in two successive rounds. More detailed:

Regular season
 Day 1 (October 10, 2001)

|}

 Day 2 (October 17, 2001)

|}

 Day 3 (October 24, 2001)

|}

 Day 4 (October 31, 2001)

|}

 Day 5 (November 7, 2001)

|}

 Day 6 (November 15, 2001)

|}

 Day 7 (December 5, 2001)

|}

 Day 8 (December 12, 2001)

|}

 Day 9 (December 19, 2001)

|}

 Day 10 (January 9, 2002)

|}

 Day 11 (January 16, 2002)

|}

 Day 12 (January 30, 2002)

|}

 Day 13 (February 7, 2002)

|}
*Overtime at the end of regulation (78–78).

 Day 14 (February 13, 2002)

|}

 Group A standings:

Top 16
 Day 1 (February 28, 2002)

|}

 Day 2 (March 7, 2002)

|}

 Day 3 (March 21, 2002)

|}

 Day 4 (March 28, 2002)

|}

 Day 5 (April 11, 2002)

|}
*Overtime at the end of regulation (75–75).

 Day 6 (April 18, 2002)

|}

 Group G standings:

2002–03 Euroleague, 1st–tier
The 2002–03 Euroleague was the 3rd season of the EuroLeague, under the newly formed Euroleague Basketball Company's authority, and it was the 46th installment of the European top-tier level professional club competition for basketball clubs, running from October 10, 2002 to May 11, 2003. The trophy was won by FC Barcelona, who defeated Benetton Treviso by a result of 76–65 at Palau Sant Jordi in Barcelona, Spain. Overall, Olympiacos achieved in present competition a record of 10 wins against 10 defeats, in two successive rounds. More detailed:

Regular season
 Day 1 (October 9, 2002)

|}

 Day 2 (October 17, 2002)

|}

 Day 3 (October 23, 2002)

|}

 Day 4 (October 30, 2002)

|}

 Day 5 (November 7, 2002)

|}

 Day 6 (November 14, 2002)

|}

 Day 7 (December 5, 2002)

|}

 Day 8 (December 11, 2002)

|}

 Day 9 (December 18, 2002)

|}

 Day 10 (January 9, 2003)

|}

 Day 11 (January 15, 2003)

|}

 Day 12 (January 30, 2003)

|}

 Day 13 (February 6, 2003)

|}

 Day 14 (February 12, 2003)

|}

 Group C standings:

Top 16
 Day 1 (February 27, 2003)

|}

 Day 2 (March 5, 2003)

|}

 Day 3 (March 20, 2003)

|}

 Day 4 (March 27, 2003)

|}

 Day 5 (April 10, 2003)

|}

 Day 6 (April 17, 2003)

|}

 Group G standings:

2003–04 Euroleague, 1st–tier
The 2003–04 Euroleague was the 4th season of the EuroLeague, under the newly formed Euroleague Basketball Company's authority, and it was the 47th installment of the European top-tier level professional club competition for basketball clubs, running from November 6, 2003 to May 1, 2004. The trophy was won by Maccabi Tel Aviv, who defeated Skipper Bologna by a result of 118–74 at Nokia Arena in Tel Aviv, Israel. Overall, Olympiacos achieved in present competition a record of 8 wins against 12 defeats, in two successive rounds. More detailed:

Regular season
 Day 1 (November 6, 2003)

|}

 Day 2 (November 13, 2003)

|}

 Day 3 (November 20, 2003)

|}

 Day 4 (November 27, 2003)

|}

 Day 5 (December 3, 2003)

|}

 Day 6 (December 11, 2003)

|}

 Day 7 (December 18, 2003)

|}
*Overtime at the end of regulation (87–87).

 Day 8 (January 8, 2004)

|}

 Day 9 (January 15, 2004)

|}

 Day 10 (January 21, 2004)

|}

 Day 11 (January 29, 2004)

|}

 Day 12 (February 5, 2004)

|}

 Day 13 (February 12, 2004)

|}

 Day 14 (February 18, 2004)

|}

 Group C standings:

Top 16
 Day 1 (March 3, 2004)

|}

 Day 2 (March 10, 2004)

|}

 Day 3 (March 17, 2004)

|}

 Day 4 (March 24, 2004)

|}

 Day 5 (March 31, 2004)

|}

 Day 6 (April 7, 2004)

|}

 Group D standings:

2004–05 Euroleague, 1st–tier
The 2004–05 Euroleague was the 5th season of the EuroLeague, under the newly formed Euroleague Basketball Company's authority, and it was the 48th installment of the European top-tier level professional club competition for basketball clubs, running from November 4, 2004 to May 8, 2005. The trophy was won by the title holder Maccabi Tel Aviv, who defeated Tau Cerámica by a result of 90–78 at Olimpiisky Arena in Moscow, Russia. Overall, Olympiacos achieved in present competition a record of 4 wins against 10 defeats, in only one round. More detailed:

Regular season
 Day 1 (November 3, 2004)

|}

 Day 2 (November 10, 2004)

|}

 Day 3 (November 17, 2004)

|}

 Day 4 (November 25, 2004)

|}

 Day 5 (December 2, 2004)

|}

 Day 6 (December 9, 2004)

|}

 Day 7 (December 16, 2004)

|}

 Day 8 (December 22, 2004)

|}

 Day 9 (January 6, 2005)

|}
*Overtime at the end of regulation (75–75).

 Day 10 (January 12, 2005)

|}

 Day 11 (January 20, 2005)

|}

 Day 12 (January 26, 2005)

|}

 Day 13 (February 2, 2005)

|}

 Day 14 (February 10, 2005)

|}

 Group A standings:

2005–06 Euroleague, 1st–tier
The 2005–06 Euroleague was the 6th season of the EuroLeague, under the Euroleague Basketball Company's authority, and it was the 49th installment of the European top-tier level professional club competition for basketball clubs, running from November 3, 2005 to April 30, 2006. The trophy was won by CSKA Moscow, who defeated the title holder Maccabi Tel Aviv by a result of 73–69 at Sazka Arena in Prague, Czech Republic. Overall, Olympiacos achieved in present competition a record of 12 wins against 11 defeats, in three successive rounds. More detailed:

Regular season
 Day 1 (November 3, 2005)

|}

 Day 2 (November 10, 2005)

|}

 Day 3 (November 17, 2005)

|}
*Overtime at the end of regulation (71–71).

 Day 4 (November 23, 2005)

|}

 Day 5 (November 30, 2005)

|}

 Day 6 (December 8, 2005)

|}

 Day 7 (December 14, 2005)

|}

 Day 8 (December 22, 2005)

|}

 Day 9 (January 5, 2006)

|}

 Day 10 (January 11, 2006)

|}

 Day 11 (January 18, 2006)

|}

 Day 12 (January 25, 2006)

|}

 Day 13 (February 1, 2006)

|}

 Day 14 (February 9, 2006)

|}

 Group B standings:

Top 16
 Day 1 (February 22, 2006)

|}

 Day 2 (March 2, 2006)

|}

 Day 3 (March 9, 2006)

|}

 Day 4 (March 14, 2006)

|}

 Day 5 (March 23, 2006)

|}

 Day 6 (March 30, 2006)

|}

 Group D standings:

Quarterfinals
 Best-of-3 playoff: Game 1 away on April 4, 2006 / Game 2 at home on April 6, 2006 / Game 3 away on April 13, 2006.

|}

2006–07 Euroleague, 1st–tier
The 2006–07 Euroleague was the 7th season of the EuroLeague, under the Euroleague Basketball Company's authority, and it was the 50th installment of the European top-tier level professional club competition for basketball clubs, running from October 26, 2006 to May 6, 2007. The trophy was won by Panathinaikos, who defeated the title holder CSKA Moscow by a result of 93–91 at O.A.C.A. Olympic Indoor Hall in Athens, Greece. Overall, Olympiacos achieved in present competition a record of 13 wins against 9 defeats, in three successive rounds. More detailed:

Regular season
 Day 1 (October 25, 2006)

|}

 Day 2 (November 1, 2006)

|}

 Day 3 (November 9, 2006)

|}

 Day 4 (November 16, 2006)

|}

 Day 5 (November 22, 2006)

|}

 Day 6 (November 30, 2006)

|}

 Day 7 (December 6, 2006)

|}

 Day 8 (December 13, 2006)

|}

 Day 9 (December 20, 2006)

|}

 Day 10 (January 4, 2007)

|}

 Day 11 (January 11, 2007)

|}

 Day 12 (January 17, 2007)

|}

 Day 13 (January 25, 2007)

|}

 Day 14 (February 1, 2007)

|}

 Group A standings:

Top 16
 Day 1 (February 14, 2007)

|}

 Day 2 (February 22, 2007)

|}

 Day 3 (March 1, 2007)

|}

 Day 4 (March 7, 2007)

|}

 Day 5 (March 14, 2007)

|}

 Day 6 (March 22, 2007)

|}

 Group E standings:

Quarterfinals
 Best-of-3 playoff: Game 1 away on April 3, 2007 / Game 2 at home on April 5, 2007.

|}

2007–08 Euroleague, 1st–tier
The 2007–08 Euroleague was the 8th season of the EuroLeague, under the Euroleague Basketball Company's authority, and it was the 51st installment of the European top-tier level professional club competition for basketball clubs, running from October 25, 2007 to May 4, 2008. The trophy was won by CSKA Moscow, who defeated Maccabi Tel Aviv by a result of 91–77 at Palacio de Deportes de la Comunidad de Madrid in Madrid, Spain. Overall, Olympiacos achieved in present competition a record of 12 wins against 11 defeats, in three successive rounds. More detailed:

Regular season
 Day 1 (October 25, 2007)

|}

 Day 2 (November 1, 2007)

|}

 Day 3 (November 8, 2007)

|}

 Day 4 (November 14, 2007)

|}

 Day 5 (November 21, 2007)

|}

 Day 6 (November 29, 2007)

|}

 Day 7 (December 5, 2007)

|}

 Day 8 (December 12, 2007)

|}

 Day 9 (December 19, 2007)

|}

 Day 10 (January 3, 2008)

|}

 Day 11 (January 10, 2008)

|}

 Day 12 (January 17, 2008)

|}

 Day 13 (January 24, 2008)

|}

 Day 14 (February 1, 2008)

|}

 Group A standings:

Top 16
 Day 1 (February 14, 2008)

|}

 Day 2 (February 21, 2008)

|}

 Day 3 (February 27, 2008)

|}
*Overtime at the end of regulation (72–72).

 Day 4 (March 6, 2008)

|}

 Day 5 (March 13, 2008)

|}

 Day 6 (March 22, 2008)

|}

 Group F standings:

Quarterfinals
 Best-of-3 playoff: Game 1 away on April 1, 2008 / Game 2 at home on April 3, 2008 / Game 3 away on April 9, 2008.

|}

2008–09 Euroleague, 1st–tier
The 2008–09 Euroleague was the 9th season of the EuroLeague, under the Euroleague Basketball Company's authority, and it was the 52nd installment of the European top-tier level professional club competition for basketball clubs, running from October 23, 2008 to May 3, 2009. The trophy was won by Panathinaikos, who defeated the title holder CSKA Moscow by a result of 73–71 at O2 World in Berlin, Germany. Overall, Olympiacos achieved in present competition a record of 14 wins against 8 defeats, in five successive rounds. More detailed:

Regular season
 Day 1 (October 23, 2008)

|}

 Day 2 (October 30, 2008)

|}

 Day 3 (November 6, 2008)

|}

 Day 4 (November 13, 2008)

|}

 Day 5 (November 27, 2008)

|}
*Overtime at the end of regulation (87–87).

 Day 6 (December 3, 2008)

|}

 Day 7 (December 10, 2008)

|}

 Day 8 (December 17, 2008)

|}

 Day 9 (January 8, 2009)

|}

 Day 10 (January 15, 2009)

|}

 Group A standings:

Top 16
 Day 1 (January 29, 2009)

|}

 Day 2 (February 5, 2009)

|}

 Day 3 (February 11, 2009)

|}

 Day 4 (February 26, 2009)

|}

 Day 5 (March 5, 2009)

|}

 Day 6 (March 12, 2009)

|}

 Group E standings:

Quarterfinals
 Best-of-5 playoff: Game 1 at home on March 24, 2009 / Game 2 at home on March 26, 2009 / Game 3 away on March 31, 2009 / Game 4 away on April 2, 2009.

Final four
The 2009 Euroleague Final Four, was the 2008–09 season's Euroleague Final Four tournament, organized by Euroleague Basketball Company.

 Semifinals: May 1, 2009 at O2 World in Berlin, Germany.

|}

 3rd place game: May 3, 2009 at O2 World in Berlin, Germany.

|}

 Final four standings:

2010s

2009–10 Euroleague, 1st–tier
The 2009–10 Euroleague was the 10th season of the EuroLeague, under the Euroleague Basketball Company's authority, and it was the 53rd installment of the European top-tier level professional club competition for basketball clubs, running from September 29, 2009 to May 9, 2010. The trophy was won by Regal FC Barcelona, who defeated Olympiacos by a result of 86–68 at Palais Omnisports de Paris-Bercy in Paris, France. Overall, Olympiacos achieved in present competition a record of 17 wins against 5 defeats, in five successive rounds. More detailed:

Regular season
 Day 1 (October 21, 2009)

|}

 Day 2 (October 28, 2009)

|}

 Day 3 (November 4, 2009)

|}

 Day 4 (November 12, 2009)

|}

 Day 5 (November 26, 2009)

|}

 Day 6 (December 2, 2009)

|}

 Day 7 (December 10, 2009)

|}

 Day 8 (December 16, 2009)

|}
*Overtime at the end of regulation (74–74).

 Day 9 (January 7, 2010)

|}
*Overtime at the end of regulation (76–76).

 Day 10 (January 13, 2010)

|}

 Group B standings:

Top 16
 Day 1 (January 28, 2010)

|}

 Day 2 (February 3, 2010)

|}

 Day 3 (February 10, 2010)

|}

 Day 4 (February 24, 2010)

|}

 Day 5 (March 4, 2010)

|}

 Day 6 (March 11, 2010)

|}

 Group H standings:

Quarterfinals
 Best-of-5 playoff: Game 1 at home on March 23, 2010 / Game 2 at home on March 25, 2010 / Game 3 away on March 30, 2010 / Game 4 away on April 1, 2010.

Final four
The 2010 Euroleague Final Four, was the 2009–10 season's Euroleague Final Four tournament, organized by Euroleague Basketball Company.

 Semifinals: May 7, 2010 at Palais Omnisports de Paris-Bercy in Paris, France.

|}
*Overtime at the end of regulation (67–67).

 Final: May 9, 2010 at Palais Omnisports de Paris-Bercy in Paris, France.

|}

 Final four standings:

2010–11 Turkish Airlines Euroleague, 1st–tier
The 2010–11 Turkish Airlines Euroleague was the 11th season of the EuroLeague, under the Euroleague Basketball Company's authority, and it was the 54th installment of the European top-tier level professional club competition for basketball clubs, running from September 21, 2010 to May 8, 2011. The trophy was won by Panathinaikos, who defeated Maccabi Tel Aviv by a result of 78–70 at Palau Sant Jordi, in Barcelona, Spain. Overall, Olympiacos achieved in present competition a record of 13 wins against 7 defeats, in three successive rounds. More detailed:

Regular season
 Day 1 (October 18, 2010)

|}

 Day 2 (October 27, 2010)

|}

 Day 3 (November 3, 2010)

|}

 Day 4 (November 10, 2010)

|}

 Day 5 (November 17, 2010)

|}

 Day 6 (November 25, 2010)

|}

 Day 7 (December 2, 2010)

|}

 Day 8 (December 9, 2010)

|}

 Day 9 (December 13, 2010)

|}

 Day 10 (December 23, 2010)

|}

 Group B standings:

Top 16
 Day 1 (January 20, 2011)

|}

 Day 2 (January 26, 2011)

|}

 Day 3 (February 2, 2011)

|}

 Day 4 (February 17, 2011)

|}

 Day 5 (February 24, 2011)

|}

 Day 6 (March 3, 2011)

|}

 Group H standings:

Quarterfinals
 Best-of-5 playoff: Game 1 at home on March 22, 2011 / Game 2 at home on March 24, 2011 / Game 3 away on March 29, 2011 / Game 4 away on March 31, 2011.

2011–12 Turkish Airlines Euroleague, 1st–tier
The 2011–12 Turkish Airlines Euroleague was the 12th season of the EuroLeague, under the Euroleague Basketball Company's authority, and it was the 55th installment of the European top-tier level professional club competition for basketball clubs, running from September 29, 2011 to May 13, 2012. The trophy was won by Olympiacos, who defeated CSKA Moscow by a result of 62–61 at Sinan Erdem Dome, in Istanbul, Turkey. Overall, Olympiacos achieved in present competition a record of 14 wins against 8 defeats, in five successive rounds. More detailed:

Regular season
 Day 1 (October 21, 2011)

|}

 Day 2 (October 27, 2011)

|}

 Day 3 (November 2, 2011)

|}

 Day 4 (November 9, 2011)

|}

 Day 5 (November 16, 2011)

|}

 Day 6 (November 23, 2011)

|}
Note On 14-11-2011, Bilbao Basket adopted a second nominal sponsor (Gescrap), and from that moment on the team was called Gescrap Bizkaia Bilbao Basket.

 Day 7 (December 1, 2011)

|}

 Day 8 (December 8, 2011)

|}

 Day 9 (December 15, 2011)

|}

 Day 10 (December 22, 2011)

|}

 Group A standings:

Top 16
 Day 1 (January 18, 2012)

|}

 Day 2 (January 26, 2016)

|}
*Overtime at the end of regulation (69–69).

 Day 3 (February 1, 2012)

|}

 Day 4 (February 8, 2012)

|}

 Day 5 (February 22, 2012)

|}

 Day 6 (March 1, 2012)

|}

 Group E standings:

Quarterfinals
 Best-of-5 playoff: Game 1 at home on March 21, 2012 / Game 2 at home on March 23, 2012 / Game 3 away on March 28, 2012 / Game 4 away on March 30, 2012.

Final four
The 2012 Euroleague Final Four, was the 2011–12 season's Euroleague Final Four tournament, organized by Euroleague Basketball Company.

 Semifinals: May 11, 2012 at Sinan Erdem Dome, in Istanbul, Turkey.

|}

 Final: May 13, 2012 at Sinan Erdem Dome, in Istanbul, Turkey.

|}

 Final four standings:

2012–13 Turkish Airlines Euroleague, 1st–tier
The 2012–13 Turkish Airlines Euroleague was the 13th season of the EuroLeague, under the Euroleague Basketball Company's authority, and it was the 56th installment of the European top-tier level professional club competition for basketball clubs, running from September 25, 2012 to May 12, 2013. The trophy was won by the title holder Olympiacos, who defeated Real Madrid by a result of 100–88 at The O2 Arena in London, United Kingdom. Overall, Olympiacos achieved in present competition a record of 22 wins against 9 defeats, in five successive rounds. More detailed:

Regular season
 Day 1 (October 11, 2012)

|}

 Day 2 (October 19, 2012)

|}

 Day 3 (October 25, 2012)

|}

 Day 4 (November 2, 2012)

|}

 Day 5 (November 8, 2012)

|}

 Day 6 (November 16, 2012)

|}

 Day 7 (November 22, 2012)

|}

 Day 8 (November 30, 2012)

|}

 Day 9 (December 6, 2012)

|}

 Day 10 (December 14, 2012)

|}

 Group C standings:

Top 16
 Day 1 (December 27, 2012)

|}

 Day 2 (January 4, 2013)

|}

 Day 3 (January 11, 2013)

|}

 Day 4 (January 18, 2013)

|}

 Day 5 (January 24, 2013)

|}

 Day 6 (January 31, 2013)

|}

 Day 7 (February 15, 2013)

|}

 Day 8 (February 22, 2013)

|}

 Day 9 (February 28, 2013)

|}

 Day 10 (March 7, 2013)

|}

 Day 11 (March 14, 2013)

|}

 Day 12 (March 22, 2013)

|}

 Day 13 (March 29, 2013)

|}

 Day 14 (April 4, 2013)

|}

 Group A standings:

Quarterfinals
 Best-of-5 playoff: Game 1 at home on March 10, 2013 / Game 2 at home on March 12, 2013 / Game 3 away on March 17, 2013 / Game 4 away on March 19, 2013 / Game 5 at home on March 26, 2013.

Final four
The 2013 Euroleague Final Four, was the 2012–13 season's Euroleague Final Four tournament, organized by Euroleague Basketball Company.

 Semifinals: May 10, 2013 at The O2 Arena in London, United Kingdom.

|}

 Final: May 12, 2013 at The O2 Arena in London, United Kingdom.

|}

 Final four standings:

2013–14 Turkish Airlines Euroleague, 1st–tier
The 2013–14 Turkish Airlines Euroleague was the 14th season of the EuroLeague, under the Euroleague Basketball Company's authority, and it was the 57th installment of the European top-tier level professional club competition for basketball clubs, running from October 1, 2013 to May 18, 2014. The trophy was won by Maccabi Tel Aviv, who defeated Real Madrid by a result of 98–86 at Mediolanum Forum in Milan, Italy. Overall, Olympiacos achieved in present competition a record of 20 wins against 9 defeats, in three successive rounds. More detailed:

Regular season
 Day 1 (October 18, 2013)

|}

 Day 2 (October 24, 2013)

|}

 Day 3 (October 31, 2013)

|}

 Day 4 (November 8, 2013)

|}

 Day 5 (November 15, 2013)

|}

 Day 6 (November 22, 2013)

|}

 Day 7 (November 28, 2013)

|}

 Day 8 (December 5, 2013)

|}

 Day 9 (December 12, 2013)

|}

 Day 10 (December 19, 2013)

|}

 Group C standings:

Top 16
 Day 1 (January 3, 2014)

|}

 Day 2 (January 9, 2014)

|}

 Day 3 (January 16, 2014)

|}

 Day 4 (January 24, 2014)

|}

 Day 5 (January 30, 2014)

|}

 Day 6 (February 13, 2014)

|}

 Day 7 (February 20, 2014)

|}

 Day 8 (February 28, 2014)

|}

 Day 9 (March 6, 2014)

|}

 Day 10 (March 14, 2014)

|}

 Day 11 (March 21, 2014)

|}

 Day 12 (March 27, 2014)

|}

 Day 13 (April 4, 2014)

|}

 Day 14 (April 10, 2014)

|}

 Group E standings:

Quarterfinals
 Best-of-5 playoff: Game 1 away on April 15, 2014 / Game 2 away on April 17, 2014 / Game 3 at home on April 21, 2014 / Game 4 at home on April 23, 2014 / Game 5 away on April 25, 2014.

2014–15 Turkish Airlines Euroleague, 1st–tier
The 2014–15 Turkish Airlines Euroleague was the 15th season of the EuroLeague, under the Euroleague Basketball Company's authority, and it was the 58th installment of the European top-tier level professional club competition for basketball clubs, running from September 23, 2014 to May 17, 2015. The trophy was won by Real Madrid, who defeated Olympiacos by a result of 78–59 at Barclaycard Center in Madrid, Spain. Overall, Olympiacos achieved in present competition a record of 22 wins against 8 defeats, in five successive rounds. More detailed:

Regular season
 Day 1 (October 16, 2014)

|}

 Day 2 (October 24, 2014)

|}

 Day 3 (October 31, 2014)

|}
*Overtime at the end of regulation (76–76).

 Day 4 (November 7, 2014)

|}

 Day 5 (November 13, 2014)

|}

 Day 6 (November 20, 2014)

|}

 Day 7 (November 27, 2014)

|}

 Day 8 (December 5, 2014)

|}

 Day 9 (December 12, 2014)

|}

 Day 10 (December 18, 2014)

|}

 Group D standings:

Top 16
 Day 1 (January 2, 2015)

|}

 Day 2 (January 8, 2015)

|}

 Day 3 (January 16, 2015)

|}

 Day 4 (January 23, 2015)

|}

 Day 5 (January 29, 2015)

|}

 Day 6 (February 5, 2015)

|}

 Day 7 (February 12, 2015)

|}

 Day 8 (February 27, 2015)

|}

 Day 9 (March 6, 2015)

|}

 Day 10 (March 13, 2015)

|}

 Day 11 (March 20, 2015)

|}

 Day 12 (March 26, 2015)

|}

 Day 13 (April 3, 2015)

|}

 Day 14 (April 10, 2015)

|}

 Group F standings:

Quarterfinals
 Best-of-5 playoff: Game 1 away on April 15, 2015 / Game 2 away on April 17, 2015 / Game 3 at home on April 21, 2015 / Game 4 at home on April 23, 2015.

Final four
The 2015 Euroleague Final Four, was the 2014–15 season's Euroleague Final Four tournament, organized by Euroleague Basketball Company.

 Semifinals: May 15, 2015 at Barclaycard Center in Madrid, Spain.

|}

 Final: May 17, 2015 at Barclaycard Center in Madrid, Spain.

|}

 Final four standings:

2015–16 Turkish Airlines Euroleague, 1st–tier
The 2015–16 Turkish Airlines Euroleague was the 16th season of the EuroLeague, under the Euroleague Basketball Company's authority, and it was the 59th installment of the European top-tier level professional club competition for basketball clubs, running from October 15, 2015 to May 15, 2016. The trophy was won by CSKA Moscow, who defeated Fenerbahçe by a result of 101–96 (OT) at Mercedes-Benz Arena in Berlin, Germany. Overall, Olympiacos achieved in present competition a record of 14 wins against 10 defeats, in two successive rounds. More detailed:

Regular season
 Day 1 (October 15, 2015)

|}

 Day 2 (October 23, 2015)

|}
*Overtime at the end of regulation (80–80).

 Day 3 (October 30, 2015)

|}

 Day 4 (November 5, 2015)

|}

 Day 5 (November 12, 2015)

|}
*Overtime at the end of regulation (76–76).

 Day 6 (November 19, 2015)

|}

 Day 7 (November 26, 2015)

|}

 Day 8 (December 3, 2015)

|}

 Day 9 (December 10, 2015)

|}

 Day 10 (December 18, 2015)

|}

 Group B standings:

Top 16
 Day 1 (December 29, 2015)

|}

 Day 2 (January 7, 2016)

|}

 Day 3 (January 15, 2016)

|}

 Day 4 (January 22, 2016)

|}

 Day 5 (January 28, 2016)

|}

 Day 6 (February 5, 2016)

|}

 Day 7 (February 12, 2016)

|}

 Day 8 (February 26, 2016)

|}

 Day 9 (March 4, 2016)

|}

 Day 10 (March 10, 2016)

|}

 Day 11 (March 18, 2016)

|}

 Day 12 (March 25, 2016)

|}

 Day 13 (March 31, 2016)

|}

 Day 14 (April 8, 2016)

|}

 Group F standings:

2016–17 Turkish Airlines EuroLeague, 1st–tier
The 2016–17 Turkish Airlines EuroLeague was the 17th season of the EuroLeague, under the Euroleague Basketball Company's authority, and it was the 60th installment of the European top-tier level professional club competition for basketball clubs, running from October 12, 2016 to May 21, 2017. The trophy was won by Fenerbahçe, who defeated Olympiacos by a result of 80–64 at Sinan Erdem Dome, in Istanbul, Turkey. Overall, Olympiacos achieved in present competition a record of 23 wins against 14 defeats, in four successive rounds. More detailed:

Regular season
 Day 1 (October 12, 2016) 

|}
Note Opening EuroLeague game.

 Day 2 (October 20, 2016)

|}

 Day 3 (October 25, 2016)

|}

 Day 4 (October 27, 2016)

|}

 Day 5 (November 3, 2016)

|}

 Day 6 (November 11, 2016)

|}

 Day 7 (November 16, 2016)

|}

 Day 8 (November 18, 2016)

|}

 Day 9 (November 24, 2016)

|}

 Day 10 (December 2, 2016)

|}

 Day 11 (December 9, 2016)

|}

 Day 12 (December 15, 2016)

|}

 Day 13 (December 20, 2016)

|}

 Day 14 (December 22, 2016)

|}

 Day 15 (December 29, 2016)

|}

 Day 16 (January 6, 2017)

|}

 Day 17 (January 12, 2017)

|}

 Day 18 (January 20, 2017)

|}

 Day 19 (January 25, 2017)

|}

 Day 20 (January 27, 2017)

|}

 Day 21 (February 2, 2017)

|}

 Day 22 (February 10, 2017)

|}

 Day 23 (February 23, 2017)

|}

 Day 24 (March 2, 2017)

|}

 Day 25 (March 10, 2017)

|}

 Day 26 (March 17, 2017)

|}

 Day 27 (March 22, 2017)

|}
*Overtime at the end of regulation (58–58).

 Day 28 (March 24, 2017)

|}

 Day 29 (March 30, 2017)

|}

 Day 30 (April 7, 2017)

|}

 Regular season standings:

Rules for classification: All points scored in extra period(s) were not counted in the standings, nor for any tie-break situation.

Quarterfinals
 Best-of-5 playoff: Game 1 at home on April 19, 2017 / Game 2 at home on April 21, 2017 / Game 3 away on April 26, 2017 / Game 4 away on April 28, 2017 / Game 5 at home on May 2, 2017.

Final four
The 2017 EuroLeague Final Four, was the 2016–17 season's EuroLeague Final Four tournament, organized by Euroleague Basketball Company.

 Semifinals: May 19, 2017 at Sinan Erdem Dome, in Istanbul, Turkey.

|}

 Final: May 21, 2017 at Sinan Erdem Dome, in Istanbul, Turkey.

|}

 Final four standings:

2017–18 Turkish Airlines EuroLeague, 1st–tier
The 2017–18 Turkish Airlines EuroLeague was the 18th season of the EuroLeague, under the Euroleague Basketball Company's authority, and it was the 61st installment of the European top-tier level professional club competition for basketball clubs, running from October 12, 2017 to May 20, 2018. The trophy was won by Real Madrid, who defeated the title holder Fenerbahçe Doğuş by a result of 85–80 at Štark Arena in Belgrade, Serbia. Overall, Olympiacos achieved in present competition a record of 20 wins against 14 defeats, in two successive rounds. More detailed:

Regular season
 Day 1 (October 12, 2017)

|}

 Day 2 (October 20, 2017)

|}

 Day 3 (October 24, 2017)

|}

 Day 4 (October 26, 2017)

|}

 Day 5 (November 3, 2017)

|}

 Day 6 (November 10, 2017)

|}

 Day 7 (November 15, 2017)

|}
*Overtime at the end of regulation (75–75).

 Day 8 (November 17, 2017)

|}

 Day 9 (November 23, 2017)

|}

 Day 10 (November 30, 2017)

|}

 Day 11 (December 8, 2017)

|}
*Overtime at the end of regulation (72–72).

 Day 12 (December 14, 2017)

|}

 Day 13 (December 20, 2017)

|}

 Day 14 (December 22, 2017)

|}

 Day 15 (December 28, 2017)

|}

 Day 16 (January 5, 2018)

|}

 Day 17 (January 12, 2018)

|}

 Day 18 (January 16, 2018)

|}

 Day 19 (January 18, 2018)

|}

 Day 20 (January 26, 2018)

|}

 Day 21 (February 1, 2018)

|}

 Day 22 (February 9, 2018)

|}

 Day 23 (February 22, 2018)

|}

 Day 24 (March 2, 2018)

|}
*Overtime at the end of regulation (71–71).

 Day 25 (March 9, 2018)

|}

 Day 26 (March 15, 2018)

|}

 Day 27 (March 21, 2018)

|}

 Day 28 (March 23, 2018)

|}

 Day 29 (March 30, 2018)

|}
*Overtime at the end of regulation (74–74).

 Day 30 (April 6, 2018)

|}
*Overtime at the end of regulation (80–80).

 Regular season standings:

** On 11-4-2018, Baskonia adopted a nominal sponsor (Kirolbet), and from that moment on the team was called Kirolbet Baskonia.

Rules for classification: All points scored in extra period(s) were not counted in the standings, nor for any tie-break situation.

Quarterfinals
 Best-of-5 playoff: Game 1 at home on April 18, 2018 / Game 2 at home on April 20, 2018 / Game 3 away on April 24, 2018 / Game 4 away on April 26, 2018.

2018–19 Turkish Airlines EuroLeague, 1st–tier
The 2018–19 Turkish Airlines EuroLeague was the 19th season of the EuroLeague, under the Euroleague Basketball Company's authority, and it was the 62nd installment of the European top-tier level professional club competition for basketball clubs, running from October 12, 2018 to May 19, 2019. The trophy was won by CSKA Moscow, who defeated Anadolu Efes by a result of 91–83 at Fernando Buesa Arena in Vitoria-Gasteiz, Spain. Overall, Olympiacos achieved in present competition a record of 15 wins against 15 defeats, in only one round. More detailed:

Regular season
 Day 1 (October 12, 2018)

|}

 Day 2 (October 17, 2018)

|}

 Day 3 (October 19, 2018)

|}

 Day 4 (October 25, 2018)

|}

 Day 5 (November 1, 2018)

|}

 Day 6 (November 9, 2018)

|}

 Day 7 (November 15, 2018)

|}

 Day 8 (November 20, 2018)

|}

 Day 9 (November 22, 2018)

|}

 Day 10 (November 30, 2018)

|}

 Day 11 (December 6, 2018)

|}

 Day 12 (December 13, 2018)

|}

 Day 13 (December 18, 2018)

|}

 Day 14 (December 20, 2018)

|}

 Day 15 (December 27, 2018)

|}

 Day 16 (January 4, 2019)

|}

 Day 17 (January 8, 2019)

|}
*Overtime at the end of regulation (80–80).

 Day 18 (January 10, 2019)

|}

 Day 19 (January 17, 2019)

|}

 Day 20 (January 24, 2019)

|}

 Day 21 (January 31, 2019)

|}

 Day 22 (February 7, 2019)

|}

 Day 23 (February 21, 2019)

|}

 Day 24 (March 1, 2019)

|}

 Day 25 (March 8, 2019)

|}

 Day 26 (March 14, 2019)

|}

 Day 27 (March 19, 2019)

|}

 Day 28 (March 21, 2019)

|}

 Day 29 (March 29, 2019)

|}

 Day 30 (April 5, 2019)

|}

 Regular season standings:

Rules for classification: All points scored in extra period(s) were not counted in the standings, nor for any tie-break situation.

Worldwide and other prestigious (semi-official) European competitions

1996 XXXII FIBA International Christmas Tournament
The 1996 XXXII FIBA International Christmas Tournament "Trofeo Raimundo Saporta-Memorial Fernando Martín" was the 32nd installment of the international men's professional basketball club tournament FIBA International Christmas Tournament, running from December 24, 1996 to December 26, 1996. It took place at Palacio de Deportes de la Comunidad de Madrid in Madrid, Spain and the trophy was won by Real Madrid Teka.

Round-robin tournament
 Day 1 (December 24, 1996)

|}

 Day 2 (December 25, 1996)

|}

 Day 3 (December 26, 1996)

|}

 Final standings:

1997 McDonald's Championship
The 1997 McDonald's Championship was the 8th installment of McDonald's Championship, running from October 16, 1997 to October 18, 1997. It took place at Palais Omnisports de Paris-Bercy in Paris, France and the trophy was son by Chicago Bulls, who defeated Olympiacos by a result of 104–78.

Preliminary round
 October 16, 1997 at Palais Omnisports de Paris-Bercy in Paris, France.
Bye

Semifinals
 October 17, 1997 at Palais Omnisports de Paris-Bercy in Paris, France.

|}

Final
 October 18, 1997 at Palais Omnisports de Paris-Bercy in Paris, France.

|}

Final standings

2013 FIBA Intercontinental Cup
The 2013 FIBA Intercontinental Cup was the 23rd installment of the FIBA Intercontinental Cup for men's professional basketball clubs, running from October 4, 2013 to October 6, 2013. It took place at Ginásio José Corrêa arena in Barueri, São Paulo, Brazil and the trophy was won by Olympiacos, who defeated Pinheiros Sky by a result of 167–139 in a two-legged final.

Finals
 Tie played on October 4, 2013 and on October 6, 2013 at Ginásio José Corrêa in Barueri, São Paulo, Brazil.

|}

Record
Olympiacos has overall, from 1960–61 FIBA European Champions Cup (first participation) to 2018–19 Turkish Airlines EuroLeague (last participation): 404 wins against 278 defeats plus 1 draw in 683 games for all the European club competitions.
 FIBA European Champions Cup or FIBA European League or FIBA EuroLeague or EuroLeague, 1st–tier: 385–252 in 637 games.
 FIBA European Cup Winners' Cup, 2nd–tier: 10–13 (plus 1 draw) in 24 games.
 FIBA Korać Cup, 3rd–tier: 9–13 in 22 games.

See also
 Greek basketball clubs in international competitions

References

External links
FIBA Europe
Sathanasias bravepages  
Linguasport

Europe
Oly